1955–56 was the forty-eighth occasion on which the  Yorkshire Cup competition had been held.

This year's final was a repeat of last years' final and between cup holder Halifax and last season runner-up Hull F.C. with the same outcome (albeit via a replay).
 
Halifax won the trophy by beating Hull F.C. by the score of 10-10 in a replayed final.

The original final, which ended in a 10-10 draw, was played at Headingley, Leeds, now in West Yorkshire. The attendance was 23,520 and receipts were £4,385.

The replay was played 11 days later at Odsal in the City of Bradford, now in West Yorkshire. The attendance was 14,000 and receipts were £2,439.

This was the second of Halifax's two successive victories, both against Hull FC, for whom it was their third successive cup final defeat.

Background 

This season there were no junior/amateur clubs taking part, no new entrants and no "leavers" and so the total of entries remained the same at sixteen.

This in turn resulted in no byes in the first round.

This season saw a continuation of the simple knock-out formulas, there was to be no return to the two-legged ties.

Competition and results

Round 1 
Involved  8 matches (with no byes) and 16 clubs

Round 2 - quarterfinals 
Involved 4 matches and 8 clubs

Round 3 – semifinals  
Involved 2 matches and 4 clubs

Final

Final - replay

Teams and scorers 

three (3) - Try = points two (2) - Goal = points two (2) - Drop goal = points

The road to success

Notes and comments 
1 * Headingley, Leeds, is the home ground of Leeds RLFC with a capacity of 21,000. The record attendance was  40,175 for a league match between Leeds and Bradford Northern on 21 May 1947.

2 * Odsal is the home ground of Bradford Northern from 1890 to 2010 and the current capacity is in the region of 26,000, The ground is famous for hosting the largest attendance at an English sports ground when 102,569 (it was reported that over 120,000 actually attended as several areas of boundary fencing collapse under the sheer weight of numbers) attended the replay of the Challenge Cup final on 5 May 1954 to see Halifax v Warrington

General information for those unfamiliar 
The Rugby League Yorkshire Cup competition was a knock-out competition between (mainly professional) rugby league clubs from  the  county of Yorkshire. The actual area was at times increased to encompass other teams from  outside the  county such as Newcastle, Mansfield, Coventry, and even London (in the form of Acton & Willesden.

The Rugby League season always (until the onset of "Summer Rugby" in 1996) ran from around August-time through to around May-time and this competition always took place early in the season, in the Autumn, with the final taking place in (or just before) December (The only exception to this was when disruption of the fixture list was caused during, and immediately after, the two World Wars)

See also 
1955–56 Northern Rugby Football League season
Rugby league county cups

References

External links
Saints Heritage Society
1896–97 Northern Rugby Football Union season at wigan.rlfans.com
Hull&Proud Fixtures & Results 1896/1897
Widnes Vikings - One team, one passion Season In Review - 1896-97
The Northern Union at warringtonwolves.org

1955 in English rugby league
RFL Yorkshire Cup